Ingrian dialects are the Finnish dialects spoken by Ingrian Finns around Ingria in Russia. Today, the Ingrian dialects are still spoken in Russia, Finland and Sweden. In 2010 there were only 20 300 Ingrian Finns left in Russia. The Ingrian dialects are gradually dying out, as primarily elderly people speak them anymore, and unlike Standard Finnish, the dialects are not taught in schools.

History
After Sweden annexed ingria in 1617, many people moved to Ingria from Finland. After Russia annexed it again in around 1700, many Russians moved in. However the Finnish language stayed because of the Lutheran church, the difference of religion made mixed marriages rare.

In 1900 the situation changed a lot. At first, minority languages were supported; however, around 1930 Finnish was banned and the Ingrian Finns were deported (Deportation of the Ingrian Finns, Genocide of the Ingrian Finns). Because of this, language communities broke and Russian influence became larger.

Grammar
The dialects' personal pronouns differ significantly from the standard language. Follows a comparison with the Karelian language and Standard Finnish:

Phonology

The phonology of Ingrian Finnish is very much alike that of the neighbouring Ingrian and Votic languages. 

One process present in the dialects is the deletion of final front vowels and their replacement by palatisation, much like in Ala-Laukaa Ingrian and Votic:
 äitj ("mother") for Standard Finnish äiti
 vesj ("water") for Standard Finnish vesi
 mäkj ("hill") for Standard Finnish mäki
 kylj ("village") for Standard Finnish kylä
Another is the diphthongation of historically long vowels in initial syllables, much like in the Karelian language:
 piä ("head") for Standard Finnish pää
 kualj ("cabbage") for Standard Finnish kaali
Like in the Ingrian language, Standard Finnish morphological -d- is often replaced by -v-, -vv- and -ij-:
 sovan ("war", gen) for Standard Finnish sodan (
 pöyvvän ("table", gen) for Standard Finnish pöydän
 piänj ("small") for the Standard Finnish pieni.

Vocabulary
Historically, multiple Swedish loanwords have appeared in Ingrian Finnish. Furthermore, the dialects have borrowed extensively from the neighbouring Finnic languages. In more recent years, it has also borrowed extensively from the Russian language:
 latjjat ("dress") from Russian платье (plat'je)
 liäppä ("hat") from Russian шляпа (šljapa)

Example
Follows a sample text in Ingrian Finnish:

See also 
 Ingrian Finns
 South Karelian dialects
 Savonian dialects

References 

Finnish dialects